Loinneog Cheoil is the début album by Irish singer Aoife Ní Fhearraigh. The albums features mainly traditional material from the Gweedore and Rosses area of County Donegal.

Track listing
 Ar A Ghabhail 'n A Chuain Domh
 Neansaí Mhíle Grá
 Fuígfidh Mise An Baile Seo
 Fill, Fill A Rún Ó
 Cianach Corrach
 Dónall Óg
 Seachrán Charn tSiail
 An Mhaighdean Mhara
 Cuaichín Ghleann Néifín
 Úrchnoc Chéin Mhic Cáinte
 An Chéad Mháirt Den Fhómhar
 Caidé Sin Don Té Sin

Personnel (partial)
Aoife Ní Fhearraigh - lead vocals
Dervish - instrumentation

1991 albums
Aoife Ní Fhearraigh albums